The military history of Hungary includes battles fought in the Carpathian Basin and the military history of the Hungarian people regardless of geography.

Early Hungarian warfare 

The first well established reference to Hungarians derives from Georgius Monachus' work in the 9th century. It mentions that around 837 the Bulgarian Empire desired an alliance with the Hungarians. Although the Hungarians supposedly participated earlier at the Battle of Pliska in 811.
The Hungarians began the conquest of the Carpathian Basin in 895. They continued to raid adjacent countries for many years. The Hungarians were able to defeat three major Frankish imperial armies between 907 and 910,  however a military defeat in 955 forced them to withdraw and consolidate their gains.

The Magyars advanced as far as the Iberian Peninsula, the Coast of Normandy and city of Constantinople.

The Magyar arts of war involved agility, speed, and precision. Their armies were well-organized and the men were well trained and disciplined.  The Hungarians used many tools of war to defeat there foes, the most characteristic of their weapons being the quick-firing reflex bow, which they fired accurately from the saddle, even at full gallop. They also carried sabers and spontoons, but the reflex bow remained their armament of choice. The Magyars placed an emphasis on ranged fighting – their charges were usually preceded by a volley of arrows, and followed up by hand-to-hand combat. The majority of their troops were trained to fight on horseback.

Era of patrician warfare 

The Hungarians demonstrated a use of siege weapons, including a battering ram at the Siege of Ausburg. After the death of the last king Demetrius Zvonimir of Croatia, he left no heir, so his wife Helen, the sister of Saint Ladislaus I of Hungary called the Hungarian troops to take control of the kingdom. After Saint Ladislaus' death, his nephew, the King Coloman of Hungary ascended to the Hungarian throne. The feudal lords of Croatia elected a new king, and tried to get rid of the Hungarian occupation, and then the Hungarians took up arms against Croatia, and won a bloody victory at Gvozd Mountain. After this, Coloman was crowned as king of Croatia in 1102.
The Hungarian chivalric army was at its best during the reign of Louis I, who also led campaigns against Italy in 1347 and 1350. Nevertheless, there were still light cavalry units in the army, consisting of, among others, Szeklers and the settling Kuns.
On the winter of 1458 the 15 years old Mathias Corvinus was elected as king by the Hungarian nobility. During his reign he dealt with the noble factions, and created a centralized royal authority, supported mainly by the first permanent Hungarian mercenary army, the Fekete Sereg (King’s Black Army). Mathias favored the obsolete catapults over the modern cannons already employed by his father. Light cavalry, formed by hussars and Jász mounted archers, regained part of their former role in the Fekete Sereg.
On 2 September 1686 united Hungarian, Austrian and West-European troops liberated Buda from the Turkish occupation. By the end of the 17th century Christian armies led by Habsburgs conquered all the Turkish-ruled territories. Thereafter the Kingdom of Hungary was part of the Habsburg Monarchy.
A decisive part of the fighting force – about four fifth, most of the time – was formed by the main arm of the time: infantry. The other arm, cavalry, still consisted mainly of heavy cavalry, or units equipped with mail armor, called battle cavalry. Another two types of cavalry were dragoons and light cavalry. Hungarian hussars became internationally recognized, being a prime example of light cavalry. In this era artillery became a third arm.
Two significant attempts were made at achieving independence: the war for independence led by Francis II Rákóczi (1703–1711), and the Hungarian Revolution of 1848.

Notable battles

~800–970: Hungarian invasions of Europe
~895–902: Hungarian conquest of the Carpathian Basin
899: Battle of Brenta
907: Battle of Pressburg
908: Battle of Eisenach
910: Battle of Lechfeld
910: Battle of Rednitz
919: Battle of Püchen
933: Battle of Merseburg
955: Battle of Lechfeld
970: Battle of Arcadiopolis
1044: Battle of Ménfő
1051: Battle of Vértes
1068: Battle of Kerlés
1074: Battle of Mogyoród
1091–1097: Croatia in personal union with Hungary
1097: Battle of Gvozd Mountain
1167: Battle of Sirmium
1146: Battle of the Fischa
1202: Siege of Zara
1217–1218: King Andrew II's participation in the Fifth crusade
1241–1242: First Mongol invasion of Hungary
1241: Battle of Mohi
1246: Battle of the Leitha River
1278: Battle on the Marchfeld
1282: Battle of Lake Hód
1285–1286: Second Mongol invasion of Hungary 
1312: Battle of Rozgony
1348: Battle of Capua
1366–1490: Hungarian–Ottoman wars
1396: Battle of Nicopolis
1442: Battle of Hermannstadt
1444: Battle of Kunovica
1444: Battle of Varna
1448: Second Battle of Kosovo
1456: Siege of Belgrade
1464: Siege of Jajce
1479: Battle of Breadfield
1481: Battle of Otranto
1477–1488: Hungarian–Austrian War 
1485: Siege of Vienna
1486–1487: Siege of Wiener Neustadt
1490–1541: Hungarian–Ottoman wars
1521: Siege of Belgrade
1526: Battle of Mohács
1532: Siege of Güns
1541: Siege of Buda

 1541–1664: Hungarian–Habsburg–Ottoman wars
 1543: Siege of Esztergom
1552: Siege of Eger
1566: Siege of Szigetvár
 1588: Battle of Szikszó
 1595: Battle of Gyurgyevó
 1596: Battle of Mezőkeresztes
 1599: Battle of Sellenberk
 1600: Battle of Miriszló
 1652: Battle of Vezekény
 1664: Siege of Léva
 1664: Battle of Saint Gotthard
 1683–1699: Great Turkish War
 1683: Battle of Vienna
 1686: Siege of Buda
 1687: Battle of Mohács
 1697: Battle of Zenta
 1703–1711: Rákóczi's War of Independence
 1705: Battle of Zsibó
 1705: Battle of Saint Gotthard
 1708: Battle of Trencsén
 1716–1718: Habsburg–Ottoman War
 1716: Battle of Pétervárad
 1803–1815: Napoleonic Wars
 1809: Battle of Raab
 1848–1849: Hungarian Revolution of 1848
 1848: Battle of Mór
 1848: Battle of Pákozd
 1848: Battle of Schwechat
 1849: Battle of Kápolna
 1849: First Battle of Komárom
 1849: Second Battle of Komárom
 1849: Third Battle of Komárom
 1849: Battle of Segesvár
 1849: Battle of Szőreg
 1849: Battle of Temesvár

References

Sources

Further reading

:File:Hungary from 1848 to 1860.pdf